Achalu (Kanakapura)  is a village in the southern state of Karnataka, India. It is located in the Kanakapura taluk of Ramanagara district.
Acchalu is a village which belongs to Doddamane Kutumba, the village started behind the hill on the year of 1st century by Mr. Kaarayya/ kaaregowda and Junjegowda who built a big house called  ACCHALU Doddamane (first house in Acchalu village) and who were belongs Alambaadi Junjegowda ( Alambaadi is a village, near Maadeswara hills, chamarajanagara district). They walked from Alambaadi to Acchalu village due to the king's harassments and started a new village and put the name as Achala which is calling Acchalu....

See also
 Bangalore Rural
 Districts of Karnataka

References

External links
 https://bangalorerural.nic.in/en/

Villages in Bangalore Rural district